James Small (1740, Dalkeith, Midlothian – 1793) was a Scottish inventor instrumental in the invention of the modern-style iron swing plough in 1779–80.

References

External links
 Dunse History Society

1740 births
1793 deaths
Scottish inventors
People from Dalkeith
18th-century Scottish people